Chorodna complicataria is a moth of the family Geometridae. It is found in Sundaland.

External links
The Moths of Borneo

Boarmiini
Ennominae
Moths of Borneo
Moths described in 1860